Miloslavov is a village and municipality in western Slovakia in  Senec District in the Bratislava Region.

History
In historical records the village was first mentioned in 1332–1337.

Geography
The municipality lies at an altitude of 129 metres and covers an area of 10.194 km². It consists of two parts. Miloslava and Alžbetin Dvor. Both are now under heavy real estate investment which is happening now all around Bratislava.

Demographics
According to the 2011 census, the municipality had 1,780 inhabitants. 1,589 of inhabitants were Slovaks, 47 Hungarians, 12 Czechs and 132 others and unspecified.

References

External links/Sources

Miloslavov - Webpage of Miloslavov
https://web.archive.org/web/20070513023228/http://www.statistics.sk/mosmis/eng/run.html

Villages and municipalities in Senec District